Lower Ngau Tau Kok (II) Estate was a 7-block public housing estate built on reclaimed land in Ngau Tau Kok, Kwun Tong, Kowloon, Hong Kong, located opposite Kowloon Bay station on the MTR. The demolition of the estate started in March 2010. The estate, along with the Lower Ngau Tau Kok (I) Estate, which was demolished in June 2004, formed the Lower Ngau Tau Kok Estate. A new estate, retaining the name Lower Ngau Tau Kok Estate, is being constructed on the site.

The estate was often described as the last resettlement estate in Hong Kong.

History

Lower Ngau Tau Kok Estate was formerly Ngau Tau Kok Village. It was built in the 1967 to 1969 as a resettlement estate. Ngau Tau Kok Estate was split into Lower Ngau Tau Kok Estate and Upper Ngau Tau Kok Estate in 1973. Blocks 8 to 12 were the first resettlement blocks in Hong Kong to be built with prefabricated parts. Year of intake for Lower Ngau Tau Kok (II) Estate was 1967. It has six streets that surround the estate.
The first half of the original estate, Lower Ngau Tau Kok (I) Estate, was demolished in 2004. The demolition works of the remaining half, Lower Ngau Tau Kok (II) Estate, started in March 2010 and are being conducted by the China State Construction Engineering (Hong Kong) Limited.

Gallery pre-reconstruction

Features
Lower Ngau Tau Kok (II) Estate comprised 5,400 flats in seven Mark V resettlement blocks. Apartment sizes ranged from 8.2m2 to 39.4 m2.

Lower Ngau Tau Kok Estate was among the first group of resettlement estates built with lifts. Lifts from the ground floor could reach the 8th and the 13th floors.

Lower Ngau Tau Kok Estate was also known for its dai pai dongs and cha chaan tengs, as well as the bazaars and shops surrounding each block.

Final months

In the last months before its evacuation, Lower Ngau Tau Kok (II) Estate had 3,100 households and 160 commercial tenants. People living and working there complained about the nuisance created by the many people visiting the old estate before its evacuation.

Memory
The Housing Authority has commissioned local photographers and video production companies to document the buildings and the life of their occupants. A cultural path will be built at the new Lower Ngau Tau Kok Estate to house the relics of the old estate.

Other than those commissioned by the Housing Authority, many local residents and tourists paid visits to the estate. Most of them took photos and videos in the estate, and had a meal in the estate's many restaurants.

Redevelopment
The Lower Ngau Tau Kok Estate will be six blocks of housing estate which consists more than 30 storeys and the maximum height will be 46 storeys. They were completed in 2012.

Part of the site of the former estate will also be used for the construction of the East Kowloon Cultural Centre, slated to open in 2021.

In June 2000, the Housing authority launched the final phase of Comprehensive Planning.

Gallery during reconstruction

Education
Lower Ngau Tau Kok Estate is in Primary One Admission (POA) School Net 46. Within the school net are multiple aided schools (operated independently but funded with government money); no government primary schools are in this net.

Notable residents
Lee Wai Sze, Hong Kong track cyclist, Silver medalist in 2012 London Olympics.

See also
 Upper Ngau Tau Kok Estate
 Bishop Paschang Memorial School
 Public housing estates in Ngau Tau Kok and Kowloon Bay
 Shek Kip Mei Estate, a resettlement estate demolished in 2006, except for one block, which has been listed as a "Grade I historic building"
 Public housing in Hong Kong
 List of public housing estates in Hong Kong

References

External links

 Exhibition website: "Dine at Lower Ngau Tau Kok Estate - Farewell to the Last Resettlement Public Rental Housing Exhibition"
 HK Magazine article: "Executors of the Estate", March 13th, 2009
 Time Out Hong Kong article about the estate and the exhibition
 A photo record of LNTK by photographer John Choy

Public housing estates in Hong Kong
Ngau Tau Kok